<noinclude>

The Austrian Civil War, also known as the February Uprising, was a series of skirmishes between the right-wing government and socialist forces between 12 and 16 February 1934 in Austria. The clashes started in Linz and primarily took place in Vienna, Graz, Bruck an der Mur, Judenburg, Wiener Neustadt, and Steyr, as well as in other industrial cities of eastern and central Austria.

Background 

After the dissolution of Austria-Hungary in October 1918, the Republic of Austria formed as a parliamentary democracy. Two major factions dominated politics in the new country: socialists (politically represented by the Social Democratic Workers' Party) and conservatives (politically represented by the Christian Social Party). The socialists found their strongholds in the working-class districts of the cities, while the conservatives built on the support of the rural population and of most of the upper class. The conservatives also maintained a close alliance with the Catholic Church.

As in most other newly formed European democracies of the time, politics in Austria took on a highly-ideological flavour. Both the socialist and the conservative camps consisted of political parties as well as associated paramilitary forces. The conservatives began organising the Home Guard in 1920. In response, the Social Democrats organised paramilitaries called the Republican Protection Association in 1923. Altercations and clashes between those forces (such as at political rallies) occurred frequently.

The July Revolt 
A major incident known as the July Revolt ensued early in 1927, after members of Hermann Hiltl's Frontkämpfervereinigung ("Front Fighters Union", a paramilitary association affiliated with the conservative camp) shot and killed an eight-year-old boy and a war veteran marching with the Schutzbund in a counter-demonstration in Schattendorf (Burgenland).
In July, three defendants in the case were acquitted, which led to outrage among the left. On 15 July 1927, a general strike occurred, and demonstrations took place in Vienna. After a police station was stormed, security forces fired upon demonstrators. An angry group of people then set fire to the Palace of Justice (Justizpalast), which was seen as a symbol of a flawed and partial judicial system. Altogether, 89 people (85 of them demonstrators) lost their lives and many hundreds suffered injury. However, the violence soon died down, and the factions took their battle from the streets back into the political institutions.

However, the struggles of the First Republic only worsened in the following years. The Great Depression resulted in high unemployment and massive inflation. Additionally, after Adolf Hitler became Chancellor of Germany in 1933, National Socialist sympathisers, who wanted unification of Austria with Germany, threatened the Austrian state from within.

Civil war 
On 4 March 1933, Christian Social Chancellor Engelbert Dollfuss suspended the Austrian Parliament. In a close vote (on railway workers' wages) in the National Council, each of the three presidents of parliament resigned from their positions to cast a ballot, which left nobody to preside over the meeting. Even though the bylaws could have resolved this situation, Dollfuss used that opportunity to declare that Parliament had ceased to function, before blocking all attempts to reconvene it. He also threatened to use military force against the parliamentarians if they tried to reconvene. The Social Democratic Party thus lost its primary platform for political action. The conservatives, facing pressure and violence not only from the left but also from Nazis infiltrating from Germany, could now rule by decree on the basis of a 1917 emergency law, without checks on their power. They began to suspend civil liberties, banning the Schutzbund and imprisoning many of its members. 

On 12 February 1934, a force, led by Heimwehr commander Emil Fey in Vienna, searched Hotel Schiff in Linz, a property belonging to the Social Democratic Party. Linz' Schutzbund Commander Richard Bernaschek actively resisted the search, which sparked armed conflict between a conglomeration of the Heimwehr, the police, the gendarmerie, and the regular Federal Army against the outlawed Schutzbund.

Skirmishes between the two camps spread to other cities and towns in Austria, with the majority of the conflict occurring in Vienna. There, members of the Schutzbund barricaded themselves in city council housing estates (Gemeindebauten), which served as symbols and as strongholds for the socialist movement in Austria. Police and paramilitaries took up positions outside the fortified complexes, and the parties exchanged small arms fire. Fighting also occurred in industrial towns such as Steyr, Sankt Pölten, Weiz, Eggenberg (Graz), Kapfenberg, Bruck an der Mur, Graz, Ebensee, and Wörgl.

A decisive moment in the conflict came with the entry of the Austrian armed forces, on the side of the conservatives. Though the army remained still a comparatively independent institution, Dollfuß ordered Karl-Marx-Hof, an occupied city council housing estate, to be shelled with light artillery, which endangered the lives of thousands of civilians and destroyed many flats before the socialist fighters surrendered.
The fighting ended in Vienna and Upper Austria by 13 February, but continued heavily in Styrian cities, especially in Bruck an der Mur and Judenburg, until 14 or 25 February. Afterward, only small groups of socialists continued fighting against the armed forces. By 16 February 1934, the Austrian Civil War had ended.

Aftermath

Short term 

Several hundred people (including paramilitaries, members of the security forces and civilians) died in the armed conflict, and more than 1,000 suffered wounds. The authorities tried and executed nine Schutzbund leaders under the provisions of martial law. In addition, over 1,500 people were arrested. Leading socialist politicians, such as Otto Bauer, were forced into exile. John Gunther reported that Schutzbund members received "mercilessly severe" sentences.

The incidents of February 1934 were taken as a pretext by the government to prohibit the Social Democratic Party and its affiliated trade unions altogether. In May, the conservatives replaced the democratic constitution by a corporatist constitution modelled along the lines of Benito Mussolini's fascist Italy, with the socialists coining the term "Austrofascism". However, the underlying ideology was essentially that of the most conservative elements in the Austrian Catholic clergy, a feature inconsistent with both Italian fascism and Nazism. The Patriotic Front, into which the Heimwehr and the Christian Social Party were merged, became the only legal political party in the resulting authoritarian regime, the Federal State of Austria.

Long term 

The Austrian Civil War proved a decisive moment in the history of Austria. After the Second World War, when Austria reemerged on the political landscape as a sovereign nation, politics again fell under the domination of the Social Democrats and the conservatives, the latter now forming the Austrian People's Party (ÖVP).

To avoid repeating the bitter divisions of the First Republic, leaders of the Second Republic of Austria were determined promote the principle of a broad consensus as a core element of the new political system. The concept of the Grand Coalition was introduced, in which the two major parties (Social Democrats and People's Party) shared the government and avoided open confrontation. The new system brought with it stability and continuity but ultimately led to other political repercussions, such as Proporz.

See also 
 Austrofascism
 History of Austria
 First Austrian Republic

References

Further reading
 Bischof, Gunter J., Anton Pelinka, and Alexander Lassner, eds. The Dollfuss/Schuschnigg Era in Austria: A Reassessment (Transaction Publishers, 2003).

 Schuman, Frederick L. Europe On The Eve 1933-1939 (1939) pp 55–92 online

External links 
February Uprising, 1934 at Marxists Internet Archive

This article includes information translated from the German-language Wikipedia article :de:Österreichischer Bürgerkrieg.

 
Civil wars involving the states and peoples of Europe
1934 in Austria
February 1934 events